Archville is a locality of Bonville in the Mid North Coast region of New South Wales, Australia. A railway station on the North Coast line opened in 1936, but was subsequently closed in 1974 and demolished. No trace remains. It is remembered by 'Archville Station Road', the main road. Pine Creek serves as the southern boundary.

References

Localities in New South Wales
City of Coffs Harbour
North Coast railway line, New South Wales